The DARPA Spectrum Challenge was a competition held by the Defense Advanced Research Projects Agency to demonstrate a radio protocol that can best use a given communication channel in the presence of other dynamic users and interfering signals. 

The Challenge was not focused on developing new radio hardware, but instead was targeted at finding strategies for guaranteeing successful communication in the presence of other radios that may have conflicting co-existence objectives. The Challenge entailed head-to-head competitions between each team's radio protocol and an opponent's in a structured wireless testbed environment, known as ORBIT, that is maintained by the Wireless Information Network Laboratory (WINLAB) at Rutgers University.

The Challenge awarded first place teams in the September 2013 preliminary event, and first and second place teams in the March 2014 final event with cash prizes totaling $200,000.  Each event consisted of a Competitive and Cooperative Tournament.

Qualifying Teams
Out of the 90 teams that registered for the Spectrum Challenge, the top 18 teams were selected to compete in the Preliminary and Final Event:

References

DARPA
Virginia Tech
Challenge awards